Held under the patronage of King Abdullah II ibn Al Hussein, the MENA ICT Forum 2022 (Middle East North Africa Information and Communication Technology) is a biennial conference held in Jordan.

The forum was inaugurated in 2002 as the Jordan ICT Forum to showcase the region’s ICT activities and address industry trends, opportunities, and future outlook. As such, the forum addresses how technology can help in solving pressing challenges that most nations face in today’s age, including alarming unemployment rates, healthcare, rebuilding digital economies, and the role of FinTech in creating transparency and bridging the gap between societies in hope for a better life for all citizens.

Featured keynote speakers included King Abdullah II, Intel CEO Craig Barrett, Cisco chairman John Chambers, 3Com CEO Edgar Masri, and Sun Microsystems chief researcher John Gage.

See also
IT Leader Forum

References

External links
MENA ICT Forum website
MENA ICT Forums since 2002
int@j Information Technology Association - Jordan
Jordan Ministry of Digital Economy & Entrepreneurship  - MODEE
D1G interviews Scott Shuster about MENA ICT Forum in Jordan

Computer conferences
Science and technology in Jordan
Scientific organisations based in Jordan